Parton is a civil parish in the Borough of Copeland, Cumbria, England.  It contains eight buildings that are recorded in the National Heritage List for England.  Of these, one is listed at Grade I, the highest of the three grades, and the others are at Grade II, the lowest grade.  The parish contains the village of Parton, and is largely residential.  The listed buildings comprise a country house and associated structures, a church and items in the churchyard, a former toll house, and a milestone.


Key

Buildings

References

Citations

Sources

Lists of listed buildings in Cumbria